Rambo is a surname with Norwegian (Vestfold) and Swedish origins. It possibly originated with ramn + bo, meaning "raven's nest". It has variants in French (Rambeau, Rambaut, and Rimbaud) and German (Rambow). It is now best known from the Rambo franchise, whose protagonist was known simply as "Rambo" in the novel that inspired it, First Blood (1972), and then as John Rambo in the film series.

Rambo may also refer to:

Arts, entertainment, and media

Fictional characters
John Rambo, the main character from the Rambo franchise
 Mary Rambo, female character in Invisible Man by Ralph Ellison

Films
Rambo (franchise), starring Sylvester Stallone, commonly named after the main character
 First Blood (1982)
 Rambo: First Blood Part II (1985)
 Rambo III (1988)
Rambo (2008 film)
 Rambo: Last Blood (2019)
 Son of Rambow, a British comedy film inspired by First Blood
Rambo (2012 film), an Indian comedy film
 Raambo 2, an Indian comedy film

Television
 Rambo: The Force of Freedom, a 1986 animated series based on the Rambo franchise

Novelizations
First Blood (novel), a 1972 novel by David Morrell
 Rambo: First Blood Part II, a 1985 novelization by David Morrell based on Rambo: First Blood Part II
 Rambo III, a 1988 novelization by David Morrell based on Rambo III

Comic books
 Rambo Adventures, a 1986 Italian comic book series based on the Rambo franchise
 Rambo III, a 1989 comic book adaptation of Rambo III
 Rambo, a 1989 comic book series published by Blackthorne Publishing based on the Rambo franchise
 First Kill, in November 2022 an Indiegogo campaign launched for a new graphic novel depicting Rambo's first tour of duty in Vietnam written by Sylvester Stallone and Chuck Dixon.

Video games
Rambo (1985 video game), based on Rambo: First Blood Part II
Rambo: First Blood Part II (Master System video game), based on Rambo: First Blood Part II
Rambo (1987 video game), based on Rambo: First Blood Part II
Rambo III (video game), based on Rambo III
 Rambo III, based on Rambo III
Rambo (2008 video game), based on Rambo: First Blood Part II and Rambo III
 Rambo: The Video Game, based on First Blood, Rambo: First Blood Part II and Rambo III

Music
Rambo (band), an American hardcore punk band
The Rambos, an American Southern gospel music group

People

Pseudonym
Rambo Amadeus (born 1963), Serbian-Montenegrin rock musician
 John "Rambo" Arias, one of the hip hop trio 1 Life 2 Live
Jorge Otero Barreto (born 1937), known as "the Puerto Rican Rambo"
Niko Eeckhout (born 1970), Belgian cyclist nicknamed "Rambo"
Trond Henriksen (born 1964), Norwegian football manager nicknamed "Rambo"
Afzal Khan (actor) (born 1966), Pakistani actor also known as "John Rambo"
Ronald "Rambo" Kim, American Counter-Strike player
Florin Lambagiu (born 1996), professional kickboxer whose professional name is "Rambo"
Julio César de León (born 1979), Honduran Soccer player nicknamed "Rambo"
Alan McInally (born 1963), Scottish former soccer player and male model nicknamed "Rambo"
Dejan Petković (born 1972), Serbian football player nicknamed "Rambo"
Luc Poirier (born 1961), professional wrestler whose professional name is "Rambo"
Aaron Ramsey, Welsh Arsenal football player nicknamed "Rambo"

Surname
Bacarri Rambo (born 1990), American football player
 Buck Rambo, musician of The Rambos
Cat Rambo (born 1963), American science-fiction and fantasy author and editor
Charleston Rambo (born 1999), American football player
Christoffer Rambo (born 1989), Norwegian professional handball player
Dack Rambo (1941–1994), American actor
David Rambo (born 1955), American writer, actor and producer
Dottie Rambo (1934–2008), Southern Gospel singer and songwriter of The Rambos
John Rambo (athlete) (born 1943), American high jumper
John Rambo (politician) (1661–1741), American politician, son of Peter Gunnarsson Rambo
Ken-Yon Rambo (born 1978), American football player in the Canadian Football League
Peter Gunnarsson Rambo (1612–1698), North American settler who introduced the Rambo apple
Reba Rambo (born 1951), Southern Gospel singer of The Rambos
Victor Clough Rambo (1894–1987), American physician

Places
Rambo Department, Yatenga Province, Burkina Faso
Rambo, Burkina Faso, the capital of Rambo Department
Bridge Plaza, Brooklyn, a neighborhood in New York City, U.S., sometimes nicknamed "RAMBO" (for "Right Around the Manhattan Bridge Overpass")

Other uses
Icarus F99 Rambo, a Romanian ultralight aircraft
Rambo apple, a fruit variety named for Peter Gunnarsson Rambo
Robust associations of massive baryonic objects (RAMBO), a theoretical construct in astrophysics
Rambo (fox), a feral red fox in Australia that evaded capture for four and a half years

See also
Rimbaud (surname), a French surname
Lambo (disambiguation)
Ramba (disambiguation)